This is a list of notable people from Bulacan, who are also known as Bulakenyos.

National heroes and patriots

The early people of Bulacan, had also risen in revolt as in other parts of the country. Bulacan was one of the eight provinces, which rallied behind the Katipunan's call for an all-out insurrection against the Spanish occupation in the late 19th century.

 Marcelo H. del Pilar (Kupang, San Nicolas, Bulakan), the "Great Propagandist" of the Philippine Propaganda Movement; editor in chief of Diariong Tagalog and La Solidaridad.
 General Gregorio del Pilar (San Jose, Bulakan), Marcelo H. del Pilar's nephew, one of the youngest revolutionary generals during the Philippine Revolution and the Philippine–American War, died at the Battle of Tirad Pass.
 Mariano Ponce (Baliwag), physician, Propagandist
 Pío Valenzuela (Polo), physician, Katipunan leader, established Katipunan branches in Morong and Bulacan; co-founded "Kalayaan", the Katipunan newsletter; emissary of Andrés Bonifacio to José Rizal
 Trinidad Tecson (San Miguel de Mayumo), female Katipunan revolutionary
 Felipe Buencamino, Sr. (San Miguel de Mayumo),revolutionary, co-writer of the Constitution of the Philippine Republic at Malolos
 Commodore Ramon A. Alcaraz (Plaridel), World War II veteran - Captain of Q-boat 112 ABRA Shot down 3 Japanese Zero fighters
 Gat Ciriaco Contreras (Meycauayan), Defended the Barrio of Langka and commanded the katipuneros of year 1898 against the Spaniards, one of the foundations of Bulacan alongside the Supremo Gat Andres Bonifacio. Also one of the Commanding Officers of the Supremo.

Artists
Bulacan is also home to many of the country's greatest artists, with a good number elevated as National Artists.
 Katy de la Cruz (Bustos) - tagged as the Queen of Filipino Jazz and Bodabil
 Hermogenes Ilagan (Balagtas) -  tenor, writer, stage actor, and playwright known as the Father of Philippine Zarzuela
 Francisco Balagtas, also known as or Francisco Baltazar (Panginay, Bigaa) - writer, author of Florante at Laura.
 Jose Corazon de Jesus (pen name "Huseng Batute"; Santa Maria, his father's hometown) - poet
 Basilio L. Sarmiento (Meycauayan)  - poet
 Isidro Ancheta, (San Miguel) - painter
 Constancio Bernardo, (Obando) - painter and professor known for making the earliest modern geometric abstract paintings in the Philippines and in Southeast Asia.
 Nicanor Abelardo (San Miguel) - prolific composer of kundimans
 Francisco Santiago (Santa Maria) - kundiman composer
 Enya Gonzalez (Baliwag) - opera singer
 Cecile Licad - concert pianist, descendant of Francisco Buencamino
 Jess Santiago (Obando), poet, songwriter, singer-composer, protest musician
 Rey Valera (Meycauayan), singer, songwriter, music director, scorer
 Narcisa Doña Sisang de Leon (San Miguel) - film producer for LVN Films
 Richard Velayo Abelardo, (San Miguel) - film director
 Michiko Yamamoto - screenwriter
 Carlos A. Santos-Viola (San Miguel), architect known for designing churches for the Iglesia ni Cristo

The following artists were named as National Artists of the Philippines (listed in chronological order of membership):

 Francisca Reyes Aquino, (Bocaue) - Dance (1973)
 Amado V. Hernández, (Hagonoy) - Literature (1973, posthumous award)
 Guillermo Tolentino, (Malolos) - Sculpture (1973)
 Gerardo de Leon, Film (1982)
 Honorata Atang dela Rama - Theater and Music (1987)
 Antonino Buenaventura, (Baliwag) - Music (1988)
 Levi Celerio (Baliwag) - Music and Literature (1997)
 Ernani Cuenco, Music (2000, posthumous)
 Virgilio S. Almario, (San Miguel) - Literature (2003)

Scientists and inventors
 Geminiano T. De Ocampo, (Malolos) – National Scientist of the Philippines for Ophthalmology
 Gregorio Velasquez (Calumpit) – National Scientist of the Philippines for Phycology
 Francisco O. Santos (Calumpit) – National Scientist of the Philippines for Human Nutrition and Agricultural Chemistry
 Virgilio Enriquez, (Balagtas)  – social psychologist known as Father of Filipino psychology "Ama ng Sikolohiyang Pilipino"

Religious figures
Dionisia de Santa María Mitas Talangpaz (Calumpit), Roman Catholic Servant of God, native of Calumpit with a Kapampangan blood from Macabebe and a candidate for sainthood.
Cecilia Rosa de Jesús Talangpaz (Calumpit), Roman Catholic Servant of God, native of Calumpit with a Kapampangan blood from Macabebe and a candidate for sainthood, and the sister of Bl. Dionisia.
Bishop Ruperto Cruz Santos (born in San Rafael, Bulacan, October 30, 1957), fourth and current bishop of Diocese of Balanga since July 8, 2010.
Bishop Francisco San Diego (born in Obando, Bulacan, October 10, 1935), Second Bishop of the Diocese of San Pablo, Laguna and First Bishop of the Diocese of Pasig, Metro Manila.
Bishop Bartolome Gaspar Santos (born in Sta Maria, Bulacan), fifth Bishop of the Diocese of Iba, Zambales 
Bishop Deogracias S. Iñiguez, Jr., (born in Meycauayan, Bulacan, December 10, 1940), former Auxiliary Bishop of the Diocese of Malolos and First Bishop of the Diocese of Kalookan.
Bishop Pedro Bantigue y Natividad (born in Hagonoy, Bulacan), former Auxiliary Bishop of the Roman Catholic Archdiocese of Manila and First Bishop of the Roman Catholic Diocese of San Pablo.
Archbishop Artemio Gabriel Casas (born in Meycauayan, Bulacan, October 20, 1911), first Bishop of the Diocese of Imus, former Auxiliary Bishop of the Archdiocese of Manila and the tenth Archbishop of the Archdiocese of Jaro.
Archbishop Leonardo Zamora Legaspi (born in Meycauayan, Bulacan, November 25, 1935), first Filipino Rector Magnificus of the University of Santo Tomas, former Auxiliary Bishop of the Archdiocese of Manila, Catholic Bishops' Conference of the Philippines President (1987–1991) and the 33rd Bishop and third Archbishop of the Archdiocese of Caceres.
Bishop Amado Paulino y Hernandez, Bishop Antonino Francisco Nepomuceno, and Bishop Bienvenido Mercado Lopez - The "Tres Obispos" (3 Bishops) of Bustos. The first and only small town in the whole archipelago ever to produce 3 Catholic Clergy Bishops at the same time.
Herminio Dagohoy, O.P. (Hagonoy), 96th Rector Magnificus of the University of Santo Tomas (UST), the oldest and the largest Catholic university in Manila, Philippines.
Sabino Vengco (Hagonoy), Filipino priest, theologian, and author.
Ma. Violeta Marcos, AMP (Pandi), Filipino Roman Catholic nun best known as the co-founder and first director of the Augustinian Missionaries of the Philippines, and for her contributions to the resistance in opposition to the martial Law dictatorship of Ferdinand Marcos - first through her diocesan social action involvements in Negros Occidental, and later as part of the human rights organization Task Force Detainees of the Philippines.
Daniel Razon (Calumpit), Vice-Presiding Minister of Members Church of God International, chairman and CEO of Breakthrough and Milestones Productions International Inc., TV/Radio Host.
Bro. Eddie Villanueva (Bocaue), Spiritual Leader of Jesus Is Lord Church and Chairman ZOE Broadcasting Network.

Politicians, ambassadors and military officers

 Corazon C. Aquino (Malolos), 1st Female President, Father born in Malolos City member of rich Cojuangco Clan
 Joseph Ejercito Estrada  (Malolos), 13th President of the Republic
 Blas Ople (Hagonoy), Senator, journalist, secretary of Labor and Foreign Affairs
Francisco "Soc" Rodrigo (Bulakan)  - Former senator, member of the Philippine Constitutional Commission of 1986
 Gen. Alejo Santos (Bustos), governor, secretary of National Defense during the Garcia Administration.
 Lt. General Rafael Ileto (Salacot San Miguel Bulacan) served as the 22nd Secretary of the Department of National Defense (DND) of the Philippines. He also became the Vice Chief of Staff of the Armed Forces of the Philippines (AFP). He also served as Philippine Ambassador to Turkey, Iran, Cambodia, Thailand, and Laos, Father of Scout Ranger (AFP).
 Cardozo Luna (San Ildefonso), Undersecretary of Department of National Defense, former Philippine Ambassador to the Netherlands, former Vice Chief of Staff and Lieutenant General of the Armed Forces of the Philippines
 Francisco Afan Delgado (Malolos), Resident Commissioner to the United States House of Representatives (74th Congress) from the Philippine Islands January 3, 1935 - February 14, 1936; Philippine Ambassador to the United Nations, September 29, 1958 - January 1, 1962
 Joel Villanueva (Bocaue), currently Senator, Former TESDA Director General 
 Albert del Rosario  (Bulacan), Former Philippine Ambassador the United States and currently the Secretary of Foreign Affairs. Great grandparents hail from Bulacan, Bulacan and his great grandmother, Teresa Sempio is the sister of Felipa Sempio, mother of Gregorio del Pilar
 Mar Roxas (San Miguel), his grandmother was a member of De Leon clan, a rich clan in San Miguel
 Imelda Marcos (Baliwag), Ferdinand Marcos' First Lady
 Daniel Fernando (Guiguinto), Actor and currently the Bulacan Governor
 Alex Castro (Marilao), actor, singer, model, currently the Bulacan Vice-Governor
 Herbert Bautista (Malolos), former Mayor of Quezon City
 Crispin Beltran (San Jose del Monte), Party-List Representative Anak Pawis
 Jose Maria Delgado (Malolos), first Philippine Ambassador to the Vatican.
 Roberto Pagdanganan (Calumpit), former governor, secretary of Agrarian Reform and Tourism
 Carlito Galvez Jr. (Bustos), former Chief of Staff of the Armed Forces of the Philippines (AFP) under Duterte Administration. He is also known for his leadership of the AFP Western Mindanao Command during the Battle of Marawi.
 Luzviminda Tancangco - also known as "Baby"; first non-lawyer and woman commissioner of the Philippine Commission on Elections. She was also its first female acting chairman (1998–1999).
 Rear Admiral Hilario Ruiz - former Flag Officer in Command of the Philippine Navy; one of Rolex 12 advisers of President Ferdinand Marcos during his martial law period; BRP Hilario Ruiz (PG-378), a coastal patrol boat of the Philippine Navy, is named after him.
 Conrado Mercado, Sr. - locally known as "Mr. Irrigation"; first National Irrigation Administration (NIA) Assistant Administrator; Original owner of the Mercado Ancestral House in Brgy. Bonga Menor; the government created a statue for him to serve as a memorabilia for him and his contributions.
 Conrado Mercado, Jr. - most successful Bustosenyo in the aspect of arts; famous metal-sculptor and painter; one of the greatest artists produced by the University of Santo Tomas; enlisted as one of UST's Alumni Permanent Roll of Honor; gained the Outstanding Thomasian Award in the field of arts; honored by the City of Manila with the Patnubay ng Sining Award; founded the Philippine Association of Figure Artists and became the president of Society of Philippine Sculptors; his artworks are placed in the Paraiso ng mga Bata in front of the Aklatang Bayan ng Bustos being part of the Bustos Heritage Park.
 Minister Jesus Hipolito - former Minister of Department of Public Works and Highways from 1980-1986.
 Gen. Romeo Maganto - retired and decorated police general of the Philippine National Police having awarded with 45 medals in service; former chief of Western Police District; former traffic czar during the administration of President Fidel V. Ramos and is known as the first to implement the color coding traffic scheme in 1995; featured in the films Tomagan: Story of Gen. Romeo Maganto and Leon ng Maynila, Lt. Col. Romeo Maganto.

Media figures and broadcast journalists
 Cheche Lazaro, TV host, and chairman and CEO of Probe Productions Inc.
 Joey de Leon (Malolos), TV host (notably of Eat Bulaga!), comedian, singer, and songwriter
 Dely Magpayo ("Tita Dely"), radio host
 Cheryl Cosim (Hagonoy), news anchor, reporter, radio broadcaster
 Mo Twister (San Rafael), radio host

Beauty Queens
 Gemma Teresa Guerrero Cruz (Baliwag), Miss International 1964
 Teresita Sanchez Toralba (Plaridel), Miss Philippines Universe 1953
 Agnes Rustia (Baliwag), Miss Philippines World 1976
 Maricar Balagtas (Plaridel), Miss Philippines Universe 2004, Miss Globe 2000
 Czarina Catherine Gatbonton (Malolos), Miss Philippines World 2010
 Riza Santos (Malolos), Miss Earth Canada 2006, Miss World Canada 2011
 Michelle Aldana (Santa Maria), Mutya ng Pilipinas 1993, Miss Asia Pacific Winner 1993
 Angelica Jasmine Reyes (Hagonoy), Mutya ng Pilipinas 1992, Miss Asia Pacific Top 10 1994
 Rachell Soriano (Meycauyan), Binibining Pilipinas World 1997, Miss World 1997

Other notable people

Popular celebrities, film and television artists, etc.
 Yul Servo (Baliwag City Manila City Vice Mayor and former Congressman
Mark Leviste ([[Baliwag City))] Vice Governor of Batangas
 Regine Velasquez (Balagtas and Guiguinto), singer (Asia's Songbird), actress, host
 Bert 'Tawa' Marcelo (Baliwag City), comedian
 Melanie Calumpad (Kyla) (Calumpit), singer, actress
 Jamie Rivera (Pulilan), singer
 Jolina Magdangal (Hagonoy), singer, actress, entrepreneur, TV host
 Evette Palaban (Malolos), dancer
 Orange and Lemons (Baliwag/Plaridel)
 Rosemarie Joy Garcia (Diana Zubiri), movie and television actress, model
 Ella Cruz (Angat), child actress
 Jewel Mische (Bocaue), actress, Starstruck survivor
 Maricar Balagtas (Plaridel), beauty queen
 Vergel Meneses (Malolos), professional basketball player
 Lydia de Vega (Meycauayan), track and field athlete, Asian Games medalist
 Billy Mamaril (Bocaue), professional basketball player
 Teresita "Mama Sita" Reyes (Malolos), chef, producer of culinary products
 Florentino V. Floro, former judge
 Gabriel A. Bernardo (Malolos), librarian, "Father of Philippine Librarianship"
 Rodney Santos, professional basketball player
 Reynold "Pooh" Garcia (San Jose del Monte), comedian, singer
 Bob Dela Cruz (Marilao), Pinoy Big Brother Season 1 housemate
 Mcoy Fundales, (BALIWAG City) frontman/singer for the band Orange and Lemons, and Kenyo/Pinoy Big Brother Celebrity Edition 2 housemate 
 Angelica Colmenares (Angel Locsin) (Santa Maria, Bulacan|Santa Maria), television and film actress
 Alfred Vargas (Santa Maria), actor, Representative of 5th district of Quezon City
 Bryan Termulo (Santa Maria), singer
 Ferdinand Clemente a.k.a. Makata Tawanan (Hagonoy), segment host (Balitaang Tapat, Good Morning Club on TV5)
 Krystal Reyes (Santa Maria), child actress
 Escabeche (Bustos)
 Joyce Ching (San Ildefonso), actress
 Rodrigo Jr Saturay (San Ildefonso), singer
 Jon Avila (San Ildefonso), actor
 Maine Mendoza (Santa Maria), Dubsmash Queen of the Philippines, Comedian, YouTube Sensation
 Sharlene San Pedro (Pulilan), Actress, Myx Vj
 Tristan Ramirez (Pandi) singer, Pinoy Boyband Superstar winner, BoybandPH member.
 Mika Reyes (Pulilan), Former De La Salle University Lady Spikers, Volleyball player
 Nikko Natividad (Malolos), actor, dancer, member of Hashtags

 Toni Lopena (Calumpit), actor Vincent of Pepito Manaloto, Calumpit Municipal Councilor
 Roel Cortez (Meycauyan), singer, songwriter
 RJ Nieto (San Rafael), a.k.a Thinking Pinoy - Vlogger, Radio host, Columnist

References

Bulacan